is a city located in Kōchi Prefecture, Japan.

Geography
Kami is located in the eastern part of Kōchi Prefecture. It is the only city in Kōchi prefecture that does not face the sea.

Neighbouring municipalities 
Kōchi Prefecture
 Aki
 Nankou
  Kōnan
 Motoyama
  Ōtoyo
Tokushima Prefecture
Miyoshi
Naka

Climate
The climate in the region is warm and temperate, with significant rainfall throughout the year, even in the driest months.

According to the Köppen and Geiger climate classification, the climate in that locality is classified as Cfa (humid subtropical climate).

Demographics
Per Japanese census data, the population of Kami in 2020 is 26,513 people. Kami has been conducting censuses since 1960.

History 
As with all of Kōchi Prefecture, the area of Kami was part of ancient Tosa Province.  During the Edo period, the area was part of the holdings of Tosa Domain ruled by the Yamauchi clan from their seat at Kōchi Castle. The area was organized into villages within Kami District with the creation of the modern municipalities system on April 1, 1889. The city of Kami was established on March 1, 2006, from the merger of the towns of Kahoku and Tosayamada, and the village of Monobe. On the same day, the remaining municipalities of Kami District merged to form the city of  Kōnan, and the district was abolished as a result.

Government
Kami has a mayor-council form of government with a directly elected mayor and a unicameral town council of 20 members. Kami contributes one member to the Kōchi Prefectural Assembly. In terms of national politics, the city is part of Kōchi 1st district of the lower house of the Diet of Japan.

Economy
Kami's economy is centered on agriculture and forestry. The production of forged knives is a traditional local handicraft.

Education

Kami has seven public elementary schools and three public middle schools operated by the city government, and one public high school operated by the Kōchi Prefectural Board of Education. The Kochi University of Technology is located in Kami.

Transportation

Railway
 Shikoku Railway Company - Dosan Line
  -  -  -

Highways 
  Kōchi Expressway

International relations

Twin and sister cities
Largo（United States Florida）（1969）

Local attractions

Ryūga Cave, Natural Monument and National Historic Site
TosaYamada stadium
Yanase Takashi Memorial Hall

Noted people from Kami
 Takenori Emoto
 Keisuke Katto
 Yoshitaka Katori
 Yumiko Kurahashi (1935–2005), writer and antinovelist.
 Taira Hara, manga artist born in Tosayamada
 Takashi Yanase

See also
  for asteroid 26097 Kamishi

References

External links

  Kami City official website 

Cities in Kōchi Prefecture
Kami, Kōchi